The 2005 French Open boys' singles tournament was an event during the 2005 French Open tennis tournament. Gaël Monfils was the defending champion, but did not compete in the Juniors in this year.

Marin Čilić won in the final 6–3, 6–1, against Antal van der Duim.

Seeds

  Andy Murray (semifinals)
  Donald Young (second round)
  Kim Sun-yong (third round)
  Leonardo Mayer (first round)
  Sergei Bubka (quarterfinals)
  Juan Martín del Potro (quarterfinals)
  Niels Desein (first round)
  Andreas Haider-Maurer (first round)
  Raony Carvalho (second round)
  Jérémy Chardy (second round)
  Dušan Lojda (first round)
  André Miele (first round)
  Carsten Ball (second round)
  Evgeny Kirillov (third round)
  David Navarrete (first round)
  Timothy Neilly (first round)

Draw

Finals

Top half

Section 1

Section 2

Bottom half

Section 3

Section 4

Sources

ITF Tennis 

Boys' Singles
2005